Pollock–Capps House is located on 1320 Penn Street in Fort Worth, Texas, next door to the Eddleman-McFarland House. The Queen Anne Victorian style home, located atop a bluff overlooking the Trinity River, was possibly designed by Howard Messer, architect of the Eddleman-McFarland House, and was named after Joseph Robert Pollock, a physician who moved to Fort Worth in 1887.  Pollack and his wife Phoebe sold the house to William and Sallie Capps in 1910. William Capps was a distinguished lawyer while his wife Sallie was president of the Fort Worth Kindergarten Association and a Regent at the College of Industrial Arts in Denton. Historic Fort Worth Inc. purchased the house in 1971.  Three years later the organization sold the house to Architect Robert W. Chambers.

The house is built of red brick and limestone, and has a slate roof.  The house features an octagonal tower on its northeast corner.

See also

National Register of Historic Places listings in Tarrant County, Texas
Recorded Texas Historic Landmarks in Tarrant County

References

Roark, Carol "Fort Worth Legendary Landmarks"

Chanin, Joshua "Sallie Brooke Capps: Education Trailblazer in North Texas"

External links

Houses in Fort Worth, Texas
Houses on the National Register of Historic Places in Texas
National Register of Historic Places in Fort Worth, Texas
Houses completed in 1898
Recorded Texas Historic Landmarks